The 19th United States Congress was a meeting of the legislative branch of the United States federal government, consisting of the United States Senate and the United States House of Representatives. It met in Washington, D.C. from March 4, 1825, to March 4, 1827, during the first two years of John Quincy Adams's presidency. The apportionment of seats in the House of Representatives was based on the 1820 United States census. The Senate had a majority of Jackson Men, while the House had an Anti-Jackson (pro-Adams) majority.

Major events

 March 4, 1825: John Quincy Adams inaugurated as President of the United States
 October 26, 1825: The Erie Canal opened, providing passage from Albany, New York, to Buffalo and Lake Erie.
 July 4, 1826: Both Thomas Jefferson and John Adams died on the 50th Anniversary of America's Independence

Major legislation

Treaties signed 
 November 7, 1825: Treaty of St. Louis: 1,400 Missouri Shawnees were forcibly relocated from Missouri to Kansas
 January 24, 1826: Treaty of Washington between the United States government and the Creek National Council, in which they ceded much of their land in Georgia

Party summary
The count below identifies party affiliations at the beginning of the first session of this congress. Changes resulting from subsequent replacements are shown below in the "Changes in membership" section.

Senate

House of Representatives

Leadership

Senate 
 President: John C. Calhoun (J)
 President pro tempore: John Gaillard (J), until December 4, 1825
 Nathaniel Macon (J), from May 20, 1826

House of Representatives 
 Speaker: John W. Taylor (A)

Members
This list is arranged by chamber, then by state. Senators are listed by class and representatives are listed by district.

(J) following a name means the member was of the Jackson faction. (A) that the person was a member of the Adams (anti-Jackson) faction.

Skip to House of Representatives, below

Senate
Senators were elected by the state legislatures every two years, with one-third beginning new six-year terms with each Congress. Preceding the names in the list below are Senate class numbers, which indicate the cycle of their election. In this Congress, Class 1 meant their term ended with this Congress, facing re-election in 1826/1827; Class 2 meant their term began in the last Congress, facing re-election in 1828/1829; and Class 3 meant their term began in this Congress, facing re-election in 1830/1831.

Alabama 
 2. William R. D. King (J)
 3. Henry H. Chambers (J), until January 24, 1826
 Israel Pickens (J), February 17, 1826 – November 27, 1826
 John McKinley (J), from November 27, 1826

Connecticut 
 1. Henry W. Edwards (J)
 3. Calvin Willey (A), from May 4, 1825

Delaware 
 1. Thomas Clayton (A)
 2. Nicholas Van Dyke (A), until May 21, 1826
 Daniel Rodney (A), November 8, 1826 – January 12, 1827
 Henry M. Ridgely (J), from January 23, 1827

Georgia 
 2. Thomas W. Cobb (J)
 3. John Macpherson Berrien (J)

Illinois 
 2. Jesse B. Thomas (A)
 3. Elias K. Kane (J)

Indiana 
 1. James Noble (A)
 3. William Hendricks (A)

Kentucky 
 2. Richard M. Johnson (J)
 3. John Rowan (J)

Louisiana 
 2. Dominique J. Bouligny (A)
 3. Josiah S. Johnston (A)

Maine 
 1. John Holmes (A)
 2. John Chandler (J)

Maryland 
 1. Samuel Smith (J)
 3. Edward Lloyd (J), until January 14, 1826
 Ezekiel F. Chambers (A), from January 24, 1826

Massachusetts 
 1. Elijah H. Mills (A)
 2. James Lloyd (A), until May 23, 1826
 Nathaniel Silsbee (A), from May 31, 1826

Mississippi 
 1. David Holmes (J), until September 25, 1825
 Powhatan Ellis (J), September 28, 1825 – January 28, 1826
 Thomas B. Reed (J), from January 28, 1826
 2. Thomas H. Williams (J)

Missouri 
 1. Thomas H. Benton (J)
 3. David Barton (A)

New Hampshire 
 2. Samuel Bell (A)
 3. Levi Woodbury (J), from March 16, 1825

New Jersey 
 1. Joseph McIlvaine (A), until August 19, 1826
 Ephraim Bateman (A), from November 10, 1826
 2. Mahlon Dickerson (J)

New York 
 1. Martin Van Buren (J)
 3. Nathan Sanford (A), from January 14, 1826

North Carolina 
 2. John Branch (J)
 3. Nathaniel Macon (J)

Ohio 
 1. Benjamin Ruggles (A)
 3. William Henry Harrison (A)

Pennsylvania 
 1. William Findlay (J)
 3. William Marks (A)

Rhode Island 
 1. James De Wolf (A), until October 31, 1825
 Asher Robbins (A), from October 31, 1825
 2. Nehemiah R. Knight (A)

South Carolina 
 2. Robert Y. Hayne (J)
 3. John Gaillard (J), until February 26, 1826
 William Harper (J), March 8, 1826 – November 29, 1826
 William Smith (J), from November 29, 1826

Tennessee 
 1. John H. Eaton (J)
 2. Andrew Jackson (J), until October 14, 1825
 Hugh Lawson White (J), from October 28, 1825

Vermont 
 1. Horatio Seymour (A)
 3. Dudley Chase (A)

Virginia 
 1. James Barbour (J), until March 7, 1825
 John Randolph (J), from December 26, 1825
 2. Littleton W. Tazewell (J)

House of Representatives

Alabama 
 . Gabriel Moore (J)
 . John McKee (J)
 . George W. Owen (J)

Connecticut 
All representatives were elected statewide on a general ticket.
 . John Baldwin (A)
 . Noyes Barber (A)
 . Ralph I. Ingersoll (A)
 . Orange Merwin (A)
 . Elisha Phelps (A)
 . Gideon Tomlinson (A)

Delaware 
 . Louis McLane (J)

Georgia 
All representatives were elected statewide on a general ticket.
 . George Cary (J)
 . Alfred Cuthbert (J)
 . John Forsyth (J)
 . Charles E. Haynes (J)
 . James Meriwether (J)
 . Edward F. Tattnall (J)
 . Wiley Thompson (J)

Illinois 
 . Daniel P. Cook (A)

Indiana 
 . Ratliff Boon (J)
 . Jonathan Jennings (A)
 . John Test (A)

Kentucky 
 . David Trimble (A)
 . Thomas Metcalfe (A)
 . Henry Clay (A), until March 6, 1825
 James Clark (A), from August 1, 1825
 . Robert P. Letcher (A)
 . James Johnson (J), until August 13, 1826
 Robert L. McHatton (J), from December 7, 1826
 . Joseph Lecompte (J)
 . Thomas P. Moore (J)
 . Richard A. Buckner (A)
 . Charles A. Wickliffe (J)
 . Francis Johnson (A)
 . William S. Young (A)
 . Robert P. Henry (J), until August 25, 1826
 John F. Henry (A), from December 11, 1826

Louisiana 
 . Edward Livingston (J)
 . Henry H. Gurley (A)
 . William L. Brent (A)

Maine 
 . William Burleigh (A)
 . John Anderson (J)
 . Ebenezer Herrick (A)
 . Peleg Sprague (A)
 . Enoch Lincoln (A), until 1826 (before September 11, 1826)
 James W. Ripley (J), from September 11, 1826
 . Jeremiah O'Brien (A)
 . David Kidder (A)

Maryland 
The 5th district was a plural district with two representatives.
 . Clement Dorsey (A)
 . Joseph Kent (A), until January 6, 1826
 John C. Weems (J), from February 1, 1826
 . George Peter (J)
 . Thomas C. Worthington (A)
 . John Barney (A)
 . Peter Little (A)
 . George E. Mitchell (J)
 . John L. Kerr (A)
 . Robert N. Martin (A)

Massachusetts 
 . Daniel Webster (A)
 . Benjamin W. Crowninshield (A)
 . John Varnum (A)
 . Edward Everett (A)
 . John Davis (A)
 . John Locke (A)
 . Samuel C. Allen (A)
 . Samuel Lathrop (A)
 . Henry W. Dwight (A)
 . John Bailey (A)
 . Aaron Hobart (A)
 . Francis Baylies (J)
 . John Reed Jr. (A)

Mississippi 
 . Christopher Rankin (J), until March 14, 1826
 William Haile (J), from July 10, 1826

Missouri 
 . John Scott (A)

New Hampshire 
All representatives were elected statewide on a general ticket.
 . Ichabod Bartlett (A)
 . Titus Brown (A)
 . Nehemiah Eastman (A)
 . Jonathan Harvey (J)
 . Joseph Healy (A)
 . Thomas Whipple Jr. (A)

New Jersey 
All representatives were elected statewide on a general ticket.
 . George Cassedy (J)
 . Lewis Condict (A)
 . Daniel Garrison (J)
 . George Holcombe (J)
 . Samuel Swan (A)
 . Ebenezer Tucker (A)

New York 
There were three plural districts: the 20th & 26th had two representatives each, the 3rd had three representatives.
 . Silas Wood (A)
 . Joshua Sands (A)
 . Churchill C. Cambreleng (J)
 . Jeromus Johnson (J)
 . Gulian C. Verplanck (J)
 . Aaron Ward (A)
 . Bartow White (A)
 . John Hallock Jr. (J)
 . Abraham B. Hasbrouck (A)
 . James Strong (A)
 . William McManus (A)
 . Stephen Van Rensselaer (A)
 . Henry Ashley (J)
 . William Dietz (J)
 . William G. Angel (J)
 . Henry R. Storrs (A)
 . Michael Hoffman (J)
 . Henry Markell (A)
 . John W. Taylor (A)
 . Henry C. Martindale (A)
 . Henry H. Ross (A)
 . Nicoll Fosdick (A)
 . Egbert Ten Eyck (J), until December 15, 1825
 Daniel Hugunin Jr. (A), from December 15, 1825
 . Elias Whitmore (A)
 . John Miller (A)
 . Luther Badger (A)
 . Charles Kellogg (A)
 . Charles Humphrey (A)
 . Dudley Marvin (A)
 . Robert S. Rose (A)
 . Moses Hayden (A)
 . Timothy H. Porter (A)
 . Parmenio Adams (A)
 . Daniel G. Garnsey (J)

North Carolina 
 . Lemuel Sawyer (J)
 . Willis Alston (J)
 . Richard Hines (J)
 . John H. Bryan (J)
 . Gabriel Holmes (J)
 . Weldon N. Edwards (J)
 . Archibald McNeill (J)
 . Willie P. Mangum (J), until March 18, 1826
 Daniel L. Barringer (J), from December 4, 1826
 . Romulus M. Saunders (J)
 . John Long (A)
 . Henry W. Connor (J)
 . Samuel P. Carson (J)
 . Lewis Williams (A)

Ohio 
 . James Findlay (J)
 . John Woods (A)
 . William McLean (A)
 . Joseph Vance (A)
 . John W. Campbell (A)
 . John Thomson (J)
 . Samuel F. Vinton (A)
 . William Wilson (A)
 . Philemon Beecher (A)
 . David Jennings (A), until May 25, 1826
 Thomas Shannon (A), from December 4, 1826
 . John C. Wright (A)
 . John Sloane (A)
 . Elisha Whittlesey (A)
 . Mordecai Bartley (A)

Pennsylvania 
There were six plural districts: the 7th, 8th, 11th & 16th had two representatives each, the 4th & 9th had three representatives each.
 . John Wurts (J)
 . Joseph Hemphill (J), until 1826 (before October 10, 1826 — )
 Thomas Kittera (A), from October 10, 1826
 . Daniel H. Miller (J)
 . James Buchanan (J)
 . Samuel Edwards (J)
 . Charles Miner (A)
 . Philip S. Markley (A)
 . Robert Harris (J)
 . William Addams (J)
 . Henry Wilson (J), until August 14, 1826
 Jacob Krebs (J), from December 4, 1826
 . Samuel D. Ingham (J)
 . George Wolf (J)
 . George Kremer (J)
 . Samuel McKean (J)
 . Espy Van Horne (J)
 . James S. Mitchell (J)
 . John Findlay (J)
 . James Wilson (A)
 . John Mitchell (J)
 . Alexander Thomson (J), until May 1, 1826
 Chauncey Forward (J), from December 4, 1826
 . Andrew Stewart (J)
 . Joseph Lawrence (A)
 . James Allison Jr. (J), until August 26, 1825 (before the assembling of Congress)
 Robert Orr Jr. (J), from October 11, 1825
 . James S. Stevenson (J)
 . George Plumer (J)
 . Patrick Farrelly (J), until January 12, 1826
 Thomas H. Sill (A), from March 14, 1826

Rhode Island 
Both representatives were elected statewide on a general ticket.
 . Tristam Burges (A)
 . Dutee J. Pearce (A)

South Carolina 
 . Joel R. Poinsett (J), until March 7, 1825
 William Drayton (J), from May 17, 1825
 . James Hamilton Jr. (J)
 . Thomas R. Mitchell (J)
 . Andrew R. Govan (J)
 . George McDuffie (J)
 . John Wilson (J)
 . Joseph Gist (J)
 . John Carter (J)
 . Starling Tucker (J)

Tennessee 
 . John Blair (J)
 . John Cocke (J)
 . James C. Mitchell (J)
 . Jacob C. Isacks (J)
 . Robert Allen (J)
 . James K. Polk (J)
 . Samuel Houston (J)
 . John H. Marable (J)
 . Adam R. Alexander (J)

Vermont 
 . William C. Bradley (A)
 . Rollin C. Mallary (A)
 . George E. Wales (A)
 . Ezra Meech (J)
 . John Mattocks (A)

Virginia 
 . Thomas Newton Jr. (A)
 . James Trezvant (J)
 . William S. Archer (J)
 . Mark Alexander (J)
 . John Randolph (J), until December 26, 1825
 George W. Crump (J), from January 21, 1826
 . Thomas Davenport (J)
 . Nathaniel H. Claiborne (J)
 . Burwell Bassett (J)
 . Andrew Stevenson (J)
 . William C. Rives (J)
 . Robert Taylor (A)
 . Robert S. Garnett (J)
 . John Taliaferro (A)
 . Charles F. Mercer (A)
 . John S. Barbour (J)
 . William Armstrong (A)
 . Alfred H. Powell (A)
 . Joseph Johnson (J)
 . William McCoy (J)
 . John Floyd (J)
 . William Smith (J)
 . Benjamin Estil (A)

Non-voting members 
 . Henry W. Conway
 . Joseph M. White
 . Austin E. Wing

Changes in membership
This count reflects changes from the beginning of the first session of this Congress.

Senate 
 Replacements: 7
 Anti-Jacksonian (A): 3-seat net gain
 Jacksonian (J): no net change
 Deaths: 4
 Resignations: 6
 Interim appointments: 4
 Total seats with changes: 13

|-
| New Hampshire(3)
| Vacant
| Seat remained vacant 
|  | Levi Woodbury (J)
| Installed March 16, 1825

|-
| Connecticut(3)
| Vacant
| Seat remained vacant 
|  | Calvin Willey (A)
| Installed May 4, 1825

|-
| New York(3)
| Vacant
| Seat remained vacant 
|  | Nathan Sanford (A)
| Installed January 14, 1826, after resigning as Chancellor of New York

|-
| Virginia(1)
|  | James Barbour (J)
| Resigned March 7, 1825, after being appointed US Secretary of War
|  | John Randolph (J)
| Appointed December 26, 1825

|-
| Mississippi(1)
|  | David Holmes (J)
| Resigned September 25, 1825, after being elected Governor of Mississippi
|  | Powhatan Ellis (J)
| Appointed September 28, 1825

|-
| Tennessee(2)
|  | Andrew Jackson (J)
| Resigned October 14, 1825 
|  | Hugh Lawson White (J)
| Installed October 28, 1825

|-
| Rhode Island(1)
|  | James De Wolf (A)
| Resigned October 31, 1825
|  | Asher Robbins (A)
| Appointed October 31, 1825

|-
| Maryland(3)
|  | Edward Lloyd (J)
| Resigned January 14, 1826, after being elected to the Maryland State Senate
|  | Ezekiel F. Chambers (A)
| Elected January 24, 1826

|-
| Alabama(3)
|  | Henry H. Chambers (J)
| Died January 24, 1826
|  | Israel Pickens (J)
| Appointed February 17, 1826

|-
| Mississippi(1)
|  | Powhatan Ellis (J)
| Successor elected January 28, 1826
|  | Thomas B. Reed (J)
| Installed January 28, 1826

|-
| South Carolina(3)
|  | John Gaillard (J)
| Died February 26, 1826 
|  | William Harper (J)
| Appointed March 8, 1826

|-
| Delaware(2)
|  | Nicholas Van Dyke (A)
| Died May 21, 1826
|  | Daniel Rodney (A)
| Appointed November 8, 1826

|-
| Massachusetts(2)
|  | James Lloyd (A)
| Resigned May 23, 1826
|  | Nathaniel Silsbee (A)
| Installed May 31, 1826

|-
| New Jersey(1)
|  | Joseph McIlvaine (A)
| Died August 19, 1826
|  | Ephraim Bateman(A)
| Installed November 10, 1826

|-
| Alabama(3)
|  | Israel Pickens (J)
| Successor elected November 27, 1826
|  | John McKinley (J)
| Installed November 27, 1826

|-
| South Carolina(3)
|  | William Harper (J)
| Successor elected November 29, 1826
|  | William Smith (J)
| Installed November 29, 1826

|-
| Delaware(2)
|  | Daniel Rodney (A)
| Resigned January 12, 1827, after successor was elected 
|  | Henry M. Ridgely (J)
| Installed January 23, 1827

|}

House of Representatives 
 Replacements: 11
 Anti-Jackson: 1 seat net gain
 Jackson: 1 seat net loss
 Deaths: 5
 Resignations: 10
 Contested election: 1
 Total seats with changes: 16

|-
| 
|  | Henry Clay (A)
| Resigned March 6, 1825, after being appointed US Secretary of State
|  | James Clark (A)
| Seated August 1, 1825

|-
| 
|  | Joel R. Poinsett (J)
| Resigned March 7, 1825, after being appointed Minister to Mexico
|  | William Drayton (J)
| Seated May 17, 1825

|-
| 
|  | James Allison Jr. (J)
| Resigned August 26, 1825 before the assembling of Congress
|  | Robert Orr Jr. (J)
| Seated October 11, 1825

|-
| 
|  | Egbert Ten Eyck (J)
| Lost contested election December 15, 1825
|  | Daniel Hugunin Jr. (A)
| Seated December 15, 1825

|-
| 
|  | John Randolph (J)
| Resigned December 26, 1825, after being appointed to the US Senate
|  | George W. Crump (J)
| Seated January 21, 1826

|-
| 
|  | Joseph Kent (A)
| Resigned January 6, 1826, after being elected Governor of Maryland
|  | John C. Weems (J)
| Seated February 1, 1826

|-
| 
|  | Patrick Farrelly (J)
| Died January 12, 1826
|  | Thomas H. Sill (A)
| Seated March 14, 1826

|-
| 
|  | Christopher Rankin (J)
| Died March 14, 1826
|  | William Haile (J)
| Seated July 10, 1826

|-
| 
|  | Willie P. Mangum (J)
| Resigned March 18, 1826
|  | Daniel L. Barringer (J)
| Seated December 4, 1826

|-
| 
|  | Alexander Thomson (J)
| Resigned May 1, 1826
|  | Chauncey Forward (J)
| Seated December 4, 1826

|-
| 
|  | David Jennings (A)
| Resigned May 25, 1826
|  | Thomas Shannon (A)
| Seated December 4, 1826

|-
| 
|  | James Johnson (J)
| Died August 13, 1826
|  | Robert L. McHatton (J)
| Seated December 7, 1826

|-
| 
|  | Henry Wilson (J)
| Died August 14, 1826
|  | Jacob Krebs (J)
| Seated December 4, 1826

|-
| 
|  | Robert P. Henry (J)
| Died August 25, 1826
|  | John F. Henry (A)
| Seated December 11, 1826

|-
| 
|  | Enoch Lincoln (A)
| Resigned before September 11, 1826
|  | James W. Ripley (J)
| Seated September 11, 1826

|-
| 
|  | Joseph Hemphill (J)
| Resigned before October 10, 1826
|  | Thomas Kittera (A)
| Seated October 10, 1826

|}

Committees
Lists of committees and their party leaders.

Senate

 Agriculture (Chairman: William Findlay then Calvin Willey)
 Audit and Control the Contingent Expenses of the Senate (Chairman: Horatio Seymour then Elias Kane)
 Bankruptcy (Select)
 Claims (Chairman: Benjamin Ruggles)
 Commerce (Chairman: James Lloyd then Josiah S. Johnston)
 Debt Imprisonment Abolition (Select)
 Distributing Public Revenue Among the States (Select)
 District of Columbia (Chairman: Edward Lloyd then Ezekiel F. Chambers) 
 Engrossed Bills (Chairman: William Marks)
 Finance (Chairman: Samuel Smith)
 Foreign Relations (Chairman: Nathaniel Macon then Littleton Tazewell)
 French Spoilations (Select)
 Georgia and the Creek Indians (Select)
 Indian Affairs (Chairman: Thomas Hart Benton)
 Judiciary (Chairman: Martin Van Buren) 
 Manufactures (Chairman: Mahlon Dickerson)
 Military Affairs (Chairman: William Henry Harrison)
 Militia (Chairman: John Chandler)
 Naval Affairs (Chairman: Robert Y. Hayne)
 Pensions (Chairman: James Noble)
 Post Office and Post Roads (Chairman: Richard M. Johnson
 Private Land Claims (Chairman: William South)
 Public Lands (Chairman: David Barton)
 Roads and Canals (Select) (Chairman: William Hendricks)
 Tariff Regulation (Select)
 Whole

House of Representatives

 Accounts (Chairman: Samuel C. Allen)
 Agriculture (Chairman: Stephen Van Rensselaer)
 American Colonization Society (Select)
 Apportionment of Representatives (Select)
 Bills of Exchange (Select)
 Claims (Chairman: Lewis Williams)
 Commerce (Chairman: Thomas Newton Jr. then Gideon Tomlinson)
 District of Columbia (Chairman: Mark Alexander)
 Elections (Chairman: John Sloane) 
 Expenditures in the Navy Department (Chairman: Jeremiah O'Brien)
 Expenditures in the Post Office Department (Chairman: William Wilson)
 Expenditures in the State Department (Chairman: John Bailey)
 Expenditures in the Treasury Department (Chairman: William Burleigh)
 Expenditures in the War Department (Chairman: John Mattocks)
 Expenditures on Public Buildings (Chairman: Joseph Johnson)
 Foreign Affairs (Chairman: John Forsyth)
 Indian Affairs (Chairman: John Cocke)
 Judiciary (Chairman: Daniel Webster)
 Manufactures (Chairman: Rollin C. Mallary)
 Military Affairs (Chairman: James Hamilton Jr.)
 Military Pensions (Chairman: Tristram Burges)
 Naval Affairs (Chairman: Henry R. Storrs)
 Post Office and Post Roads (Chairman: Samuel D. Ingham)
 Public Expenditures (Chairman: Weldon N. Edwards)
 Public Lands (Chairman: Christopher Rankin then John Scott)
 Revisal and Unfinished Business (Chairman: Thomas P. Moore)
 Revolutionary Claims (Chairman: Robert Allen)
 Rules (Select)
 Standards of Official Conduct
 Territories (Chairman: James Strong)
 Ways and Means (Chairman: Louis McLane)
 Whole

Joint committees

 Enrolled Bills
 The Library 
 Police and Preservation of the Capital

Employees

Legislative branch agency directors 
Architect of the Capitol: Charles Bulfinch
Librarian of Congress: George Watterston

Senate 
 Chaplain: Charles P. McIlvaine (Episcopal), until December 12, 1825
 William Staughton (Baptist), elected December 12, 1825
 William Ryland (Methodist), elected December 8, 1826
 Secretary: Charles Cutts, until December 12, 1825
 Walter Lowrie, elected December 12, 1825
 Sergeant at Arms: Mountjoy Bayly

House of Representatives 
 Chaplain: Reuben Post (Presbyterian)
 Clerk: Matthew St. Clair Clarke
 Doorkeeper: Benjamin Birch
 Reading Clerks: 
 Sergeant at Arms: John O. Dunn

See also 
 1824 United States elections (elections leading to this Congress)
 1824 United States presidential election
 1824–25 United States Senate elections
1824–25 United States House of Representatives elections
 1826 United States elections (elections during this Congress, leading to the next Congress)
 1826–27 United States Senate elections
 1826–27 United States House of Representatives elections

Notes

References

External links
Statutes at Large, 1789-1875
Senate Journal, First Forty-three Sessions of Congress
House Journal, First Forty-three Sessions of Congress
Biographical Directory of the U.S. Congress
U.S. House of Representatives: House History
U.S. Senate: Statistics and Lists